The men's half marathon event at the 2015 African Games was held on 17 September.

Results

References

Half marathon
Half marathons